Brannock High School is a non-denominational, co-educational comprehensive secondary school in Newarthill, North Lanarkshire, Scotland. It is situated on Loanhead Road.

Feeder schools
The school catchment area takes in Carfin, Holytown, New Stevenston and Newarthill, in which the associated primary schools are Holytown Primary School, Keir Hardie Memorial Primary School, New Stevenston Primary School and Newarthill Primary School. A number of pupils from the Bellshill area also attend.

Language and Communication Support Centre
There is a Language and Communication Support Centre based within the school for young people with ASD.

References

External links
School website
School Facebook Page

Secondary schools in North Lanarkshire
1982 establishments in Scotland
Educational institutions established in 1982